Japan Landa Imphal is a 2012 Indian Meitei language WWII historical romantic fiction film produced by Chandam Shyamcharan. The story is based on a romance between a Meitei girl and a Japanese soldier during the WWII Battle of Imphal in 1944.

See also 
 Imphal 1944
 Imphal Peace Museum
 My Japanese Niece

References 

Battle of Imphal films
Japanese-Meitei culture
2010s Meitei-language films
2012 films
Indian war drama films
Indian World War II films